YSR Nethanna Nestham is a welfare program launched by the Government of Andhra Pradesh to improve the lifestyle and productivity of weavers of the state.

Development 
YSR Nethanna Nestham was launched by Chief minister of Andhra Pradesh Y. S. Jagan Mohan Reddy on 21 December 2019 in Dharmavaram, Anantapur district. The second phase of the scheme was launched on 20 June 2020 with the budget of ₹194.46 crore benefiting 81,024 weaver families. Third phase was launched on 10 August 2021 with a budget of ₹192 crore.

The scheme 
YSR Nethanna Nestham was introduced to financially assist the families of weavers from poor economic background by depositing an amount of ₹24,000 in their bank accounts every year. A total of 85,000 weaver families got benefited with the scheme.

The government has also introduced e-marketing facility to the handloom products through Andhra Pradesh State Handloom Weavers Cooperative Society (APCO) also placing them on e-commerce websites like Amazon India and Flipkart.

References 

Government of Andhra Pradesh